Radek Martínek (born August 31, 1976) is a Czech former professional ice hockey defenceman who last played for the New York Islanders in the National Hockey League (NHL).

Playing career
Martínek was an eighth-round selection, 228th overall, by the New York Islanders in the 1999 NHL Entry Draft. After playing professionally for five seasons in his native Czech Extraliga with HC České Budějovice, he joined the Islanders in 2001 and entrenched himself as a mainstay on the blueline. With the exception of Rick DiPietro, Martínek had the longest tenure with the Islanders of any current player until he was signed as a free agent by the Columbus Blue Jackets on July 6, 2011.

Martínek opened the 2011–12 season with the Blue Jackets, scoring one goal in seven games before he suffered a season-ending concussion against the Detroit Red Wings on October 21, 2011 and also lost teeth and broke his leg.

In returning to health and as a free agent with the NHL lockout in effect, Martínek signed as he did during the previous lockout with his Czech team, České Budějovice, on September 19, 2012. He appeared in only four games with the club before he left to return to North America. With an agreement in place to end the labour dispute, Martínek was signed to a one-year deal with his former team, the New York Islanders, to add depth and compete for the final defensive spot on January 13, 2013.

Martínek won a gold medal at the 2001 World Championships as a member of the Czech national team. He was also member of Czech team on 2011 World Championships (Bronze medal). Has two kids named Veronika Martinkova and Anna Martinkova and a wife Jana Martinkova.

Career statistics

Regular season and playoffs

International

References

External links

1976 births
Living people
Bridgeport Sound Tigers players
Czech ice hockey defencemen
Columbus Blue Jackets players
Motor České Budějovice players
New York Islanders draft picks
New York Islanders players
Sportspeople from Havlíčkův Brod
Czech expatriate ice hockey players in the United States